Henry Akubuiro  is a Nigerian literary journalist, novelist and short story writer.

Early life and career 
Akubuiro graduated from the Department of English and Literary Studies, Imo State University, Owerri in 2003. He began  his journalism career as an undergraduate at the university, where he became the pioneer editor of The Elite—the student newspaper in Imo State University—and The Imo Star—the newspaper of the Student Union Government.
He won the 1998 BBC World Service Young Reporters' Competition and the National Essay Competition organised by the Federal Ministry of Youth and Sports.

And in 2005, he won the ANA Literary Journalist of the Year; while his unpublished juvenilia, Little Wizard of Okokomaiko, won the 2009 ANA/Lantern Prize for Fiction.

In 2016, he wrote Prodigals in Paradise, which was shortlisted for the 2016 ANA Prose Prize.

References 

Nigerian editors
Living people
Nigerian journalists
Imo State University alumni
Igbo people
Nigerian writers
Year of birth missing (living people)